Commander Geoffrey Gledhill Turner,   (10 September 1903 – 9 February 1959) was an officer in the Royal Naval Volunteer Reserve during the Second World War and a recipient of the George Cross. He is one of only eight people who have won both the George Cross and George Medal.

Early life
Turner was born in Sheffield on 10 September 1903 the eldest son of Charles Turner a Chartered Accountant and his wife Kathleen. Turner attended King Edward VII School in Sheffield from 1911 to 1921.

Second World War
Turner was responsible for defusing a succession of unexploded bombs and mines during the Blitz in Yorkshire and Lancashire.  He was awarded his George Cross for tackling a bomb which fell on Seaforth, near Liverpool-Stockport railway line.  The fuse was badly damaged and exploded while Turner was attempting to remove it, wounding him.  Notice of his award appeared in The London Gazette on 27 June 1941. The citation in read: "for great gallantry and undaunted devotion to duty".

Turner was also awarded the George Medal, this for recovering a mine from a German plane that had been shot down at Fairlight, near Hastings in Sussex.  The citation was published in The London Gazette on 18 May 1943.

References

External links

British recipients of the George Cross
Royal Navy recipients of the George Cross
Royal Navy officers
Recipients of the George Medal
1903 births
1959 deaths
Royal Naval Volunteer Reserve personnel of World War II
People educated at King Edward VII School, Sheffield
Military personnel from Sheffield
Bomb disposal personnel
Recipients of the Queen's Commendation for Brave Conduct